Vallières-sur-Fier (literally Vallières on Fier) is a commune in the Haute-Savoie department in the Auvergne-Rhône-Alpes region in south-eastern France. The municipality was established on 1 January 2019 and consist of the communes of Vallières and Val-de-Fier.

References

Communes of Haute-Savoie
2019 establishments in France
Populated places established in 2019